Andries Beeckman (baptized 31 August 1628, Hasselt  - buried 9 August 1664, Amsterdam)
was a Dutch painter of the 17th century. He is especially famous for his paintings of Southeast Asia and Batavia c. 1660. In 1657 he was known as Andries Beeckman from Zutphen and is last mentioned as finishing two paintings in Amsterdam in 1663. An Andries Beeckman was buried on August 9, 1664 in the Nieuwe Kerk (Amsterdam)

See also
History of Jakarta

Publication
 Menno Jonker, Erlend de Groot en Caroline de Hart, Van velerlei pluimage. Zeventiende-eeuwse waterverftekeningen van Andries Beeckman. Nijmegen, Uitgeverij Van Tilt, 2014.

Notes

External links

1628 births
1664 deaths
Dutch Golden Age painters
Dutch male painters
People from Zutphen
17th-century Dutch East Indies people
Burials at the Nieuwe Kerk, Amsterdam
Dutch East India Company people